Fred Sikking (born Hilversum, 20 February 1980) is a Belgian or Dutch Muay Thai kickboxer who competes in the cruiserweight and heavyweight divisions. He fights for GLORY and SUPERKOMBAT. As of 12 March 2018, he was ranked the #5 light-heavyweight in the world by LiverKick.com.

Kickboxing record (Incomplete)

|-
|-  bgcolor="#cfc"
| 2020-9-26 || Win ||align=left| Raymon Bonte || Enfusion ECE 03 || Alkmaar, Netherlands || KO (Leg break) || 1 ||
|-
! style=background:white colspan=9 |
|-
|-  bgcolor="#FFBBBB"
| 2019-12-6 || Loss ||align=left|  Nidal Bchiri || Enfusion 92 || Abu Dhabi, United Arab Emirates || Decision (Unanimous) || 3 || 3:00
|-
|-  bgcolor="#FFBBBB"
| 2019-10-26 || Loss ||align=left| Muhammed Balli || CWS05 || Neu-Ulm, Germany || Decision (Unanimous) || 3 || 3:00
|-
|-  bgcolor="#FFBBBB"
| 2019-10-5 || Loss ||align=left| Thomas Bridgewater || Enfusion 88 || Dordrecht, The Netherlands || Decision (Unanimous) || 3 || 3:00
|-
|-  bgcolor="#FFBBBB"
| 2019-06-19 || Loss ||align=left| Danyo Ilunga  || Steko´s Fight Club || Germany || KO (Right Hook) || 2 || 1:24
|-
|-  bgcolor="#FFBBBB"
| 2018-06-23 || Loss ||align=left| Clyde Brunswijk || Enfusion Talents 54 || Netherlands || TKO || 3 ||
|-
|-  bgcolor="#CCFFCC" 
| 2018-03-25 || Win ||align=left| Ricardo van den Bos || WFL: Wildcard Tournament, Semi Finals || Almere, Netherlands || Decision  || 3  || 3:00
|-
|-  bgcolor="#FFBBBB"
| 2017-10-29 || Loss ||align=left| Boy Boy Martin || WFL: Manhoef vs. Bonjasky, Final 16  || Almere, Netherlands || Decision Overturned || 3 || 3:00
|-
|-  bgcolor="#FFBBBB"
| 2017-09-30 || Loss ||align=left| Brian Douwes || House of Pain || Alkmaar, Netherlands || Decision (unanimous)|| 3 || 3:00
|-
|-  bgcolor="#CCFFCC"
| 2017-04-23 || Win ||align=left| Michael Duut || WFL - Champion vs. Champion || Almere, Netherlands || KO || 1 ||  
|-
|-  bgcolor="#FFBBBB"
| 2016-09-10 || Loss ||align=left| Radovan Kulla || W5 Europe - Fortune Favours the Brave || Zvolen, Slovakia || Decision (unanimous)|| 3 || 3:00
|-
|-  bgcolor="#CCFFCC"
| 2016-05-14 || Win ||align=left| Frédéric Sinistra  || Enfusion || Nijmegen, Netherlands  || TKO (Corner Stoppage)  || 2 || 0:00
|- 
|-  bgcolor="#FFBBBB"
| 2016-03-04 || Loss ||align=left| Ibrahim El Bouni || WFL || Hoofddorp, Netherlands || Decision || 3 || 3:00
|-
|-  bgcolor="#FFBBBB"
| 2016-01-23 || Loss ||align=left| Bas Vorstenbosch  || Sportmani Events VIII || Amsterdam, Netherlands || Decision || 3 || 3:00
|-
|-  bgcolor="#FFBBBB"
| 2015-12-04 || Loss ||align=left| Zinedine Hameur-Lain || Glory 26: Amsterdam || Amsterdam, Netherlands || Decision (unanimous) || 3 || 3:00
|-
|-  bgcolor="#FFBBBB"
| 2015-10-18 || Loss ||align=left| Luis Tavares || WFL - Unfinished Business, Semi Finals || Hoofddorp, Netherlands || Decision || 3 || 3:00
|-
|-  bgcolor="#FFBBBB"
| 2015-08-01 || Loss ||align=left| Andrei Stoica || SUPERKOMBAT World Grand Prix IV 2015 || Mamaia, Romania || KO (left hook) || 1 || 1:35
|-
! style=background:white colspan=9 |
|- 
|- 
|-  bgcolor="#FFBBBB"
| 2015-04-19 || Loss ||align=left| Boy Boy Martin  || The Best of all Elements || Almere, Netherlands || Decision || 3 || 3:00
|- 
|-  bgcolor="#FFBBBB"
| 2014-11-30 || Loss ||align=left| Redouan Cairo || Real Fighters: A Night 2 Remember || Hilversum, Netherlands || Decision (unanimous) || 5 || 3:00  
|-
! style=background:white colspan=9 |
|-  
|-  bgcolor="#FFBBBB"
| 2014-01-25 || Loss ||align=left| Dennis Stolzenbach  || Enfusion Live 13 || Eindhoven, Netherlands || TKO (Doctor stiop.) || 1 || 
|-
|-  bgcolor="#CCFFCC"
| 2013-05-13 || Win ||align=left| Dewey Cooper || Muaythai Superfight || Pattaya, Thailand || Decision (unanimous) || 5 || 3:00
|-
! style=background:white colspan=9 |
|-
|-  bgcolor="#CCFFCC"
| 2012-09-02 || Win ||align=left| Hakan Aksoy || Muay Thai Mania || The Hague, Netherlands || Decision  || 3 || 3:00
|-
|-  bgcolor="#FFBBBB"
| 2011-11-19 || Loss ||align=left| César Córdoba || King Of Warriors || Barcelona, Spain || KO || 1 ||   
|-
! style=background:white colspan=9 |
|-
|-  bgcolor="#CCFFCC"
| 2011-10-30 || Win ||align=left| Rodney Glunder || Twilight's Fight Night || Hilversum, Netherlands || Decision (split) || 3 || 3:00
|-
|-  bgcolor="#FFBBBB"
| 2011-05-27 || Loss ||align=left| Jiri Zak || Grand Prix Chomutov || Chomutov, Czech Republic || Decision || 5 || 3:00  
|-
! style=background:white colspan=9 |
|-
|-  bgcolor="#FFBBBB"
| 2011-02-18 || Loss ||align=left| Bogdan Stoica || Real Pain Challenge: Rising Force || Sofia, Bulgaria || KO (right hook) || 1 || 
|-
|-  bgcolor="#CCFFCC"
| 2010-08-29 || Win ||align=left| Eddy Almeida || Fighting with the Stars || Paramaribo, Suriname || Decision || 3 || 3:00 
|-
|-  bgcolor="#CCFFCC"
| 2008-05-10 || Win ||align=left| Sammy Masa || Millfights Cup || Seevetal, Germany || KO || 1 || 
|-
|-  bgcolor="#CCFFCC"
| 2007 || Win ||align=left| Turbo ||  || Patong, Thailand || TKO ||  || 
|-
|-
| colspan=9 | Legend:

See also  
List of male kickboxers

References

External links
Profile at Glory World Series

1980 births
Living people
Dutch male kickboxers
Light heavyweight kickboxers
Cruiserweight kickboxers
Heavyweight kickboxers
Dutch Muay Thai practitioners
Glory kickboxers
SUPERKOMBAT kickboxers